Bladud or Blaiddyd is a legendary king of the Britons, although there is no historical evidence for his existence. He is first mentioned in Geoffrey of Monmouth's Historia Regum Britanniae ( 1136), which describes him as the son of King Rud Hud Hudibras, and the tenth ruler in line from the first king, Brutus, saying Bladud was contemporaneous with the biblical prophet Elijah (9th century BC).

A Bleydiud son of Caratauc is mentioned in the Welsh Harley MS 3859 genealogies (in the British Library), suggesting to some that Geoffrey misinterpreted a scrap of Welsh genealogy (such as the Harleian genealogies itself or a related text). The Welsh form of the name is given as Blaiddyd in manuscripts of the Brut Tysilio (Welsh translations of Geoffrey's Historia). The meaning of the name is "Wolf-lord" (Welsh blaidd "wolf" + iudd "lord"). In the text he is said to have founded the city of Bath. He was succeeded by his son Leir (the Shakespearean King Lear).

The tale of Bladud was later embellished by other authors, such as John Hardyng and John Higgins, writing in the fifteenth and sixteenth centuries.

Legend

According to the final form of the legend, which appeared in John Hardyng's Chronicles of 1457, Bladud's father sent his son to be educated in the liberal arts in Athens. After his father's death he returned with four philosophers, and founded a university at Stamford, Lincolnshire, which flourished until Saint Augustine of Canterbury suppressed it on account of heresies which were taught there.

Supposedly he ruled for twenty years from 863 BC or perhaps 500 BC, in which time he built Kaerbadum or Caervaddon (Bath), creating the hot springs there by the use of magic. He dedicated the city to the goddess Athena or Minerva, and in honour of her, lit undying fires, whose flames turned to balls of stone as they grew low, with new ones springing up in their stead: an embellishment of an account from the third-century writer Solinus of the use of local coal on the altars of her temple.

Leprosy

Bladud supposedly founded the city of Bath because, while he was in Athens, he contracted
leprosy; when he returned home he was imprisoned as a result, but escaped and went far off to go into hiding. He found employment as a swineherd at Swainswick ("Swineswick"), about two miles from the later site of Bath, and noticed that his pigs would go into an alder-moor in cold weather and return covered in black mud.

He found that this mud was warm, and that the pigs wallowed to enjoy the heat.  He also noticed that the pigs which did this did not suffer from skin diseases as others did, and on trying the mud-bath himself found that he was cured of his leprosy. He was then restored to his position as heir-apparent to his father, and founded Bath so that others might also benefit as he had done.

The story of Bladud's cure-by-immersion was much exploited when Bath became a fashionable spa resort. The statue of King Bladud overlooking the King's Bath at Bath carries the date of 1699, but it is much older than this. It was assembled from parts of two statues (respectively depicting Edward III and Bladud himself) previously mounted on the city's north and south gates; its pitted appearance from weathering enhanced the association with disease.

In the eighteenth century Bladud's legendary cure was celebrated by John Wood, the architect responsible for the fashionable development of Bath, who incorporated many references to the king in his buildings.

Divination, wings and death

The tale claims that Bladud also encouraged the practice of necromancy, or divination through the spirits of the dead.  Through this practice, he is said to have constructed wings for himself and to have tried to fly to (or from) the temple of Apollo in Trinovantum (London) or Troja Nova (New Troy), but to have been killed when he hit a wall, or to have fallen and been dashed to pieces or to have broken his neck. He was supposedly buried at New Troy and succeeded by his son, Leir.

Conflation with Abaris the Hyperborean
Eighteenth century Bath architect John Wood wrote about Bladud, and put forth the fanciful suggestion that he should be identified with Abaris the Hyperborean, the healer known from Classical Greek sources.

In fiction
Vera Chapman's Blaedud the Birdman is a fantasy novel about the character.

Moyra Caldecott's The Winged Man is a fictional account of the life of Bladud.

Bladud, styled Blaiddyd, is a legendary hero in Fire Emblem: Three Houses.

House of Brutus

See also
 List of legendary rulers of Cornwall
 Pseudohistorical
 Nennius 
 King of the Britons

Notes

a. In the Brythonic language of the time the dd of "Blaiddyd" would have been pronounced , which has allowed some authors to call him "Bathulf, the founder of Bath".

References

Citations

Sources
 John Clark, Bladud of Bath: The archaeology of a legend, Folklore vol. 105 (1994), 39–50.
 Howard C Levis FSA, Bladud of Bath: the British King who tried to fly, West Country Editions: Bath (1973).
 MacKillop, James (1998). Dictionary of Celtic Mythology. Oxford. .
 Jean Manco, The mystery of Bladud, part of Bath Past.

Legendary British kings
Flight folklore
Artificial wings